Ride This – The Covers EP is an EP by Los Lobos, released August 3, 2004 by Hollywood Records. 
It is a companion piece to the album The Ride, released three months earlier, which featured numerous guest musicians. On Ride This, Los Lobos covers songs by seven of these artists, namely Tom Waits, Bobby Womack, Elvis Costello, Rubén Blades, Richard Thompson, 1960s Chicano rock band Thee Midniters, and the Blasters.

Reception
AllMusic rated the album three-and-a-half stars out of five, writing that "Los Lobos honor the spirit of the originals while putting their own spin on the material". Giving the same rating, Rolling Stone felt similarly, writing: "The band deftly rearranges the dynamics of each song ... the often exquisite results reveal new dimensions in every cut."

Track listing

Personnel 
Credits adapted from the EP liner notes.

Los Lobos
 David Hidalgo 
 Louie Pérez 
 Cesar Rosas 
 Conrad Lozano 
 Steve Berlin

Additional musicians
 Cougar Estrada – drums, percussion 
 Victor Bisetti – percussion

Production
 Los Lobos – producer
 Robert Carranza – engineer (1, 2, 5, 6), mixing (1, 2, 5, 6)
 Dave McNair – engineer (3, 4), mixing(3, 4), mastering
 Michael Comstock – engineer (3, 4)
 Cesar Rosas  – engineer (4)
 Dan Gale – engineer (7)
 Louie Perez – art direction
 Al Quattrocchi – art direction
 Jeff Smith – art direction
 Tornado Design – design, photography 
 Max Aguilera-Hellweg – photography

References

2004 EPs
Los Lobos EPs
Covers EPs
Hollywood Records EPs
Soul EPs